Geordie Racer is an educational BBC Look and Read production, which was first aired on BBC2 from 12 January to 22 March 1988.

The story was set in Newcastle-upon-Tyne and the surrounding area, and featured pigeon racers and runners competing in the Great North Run. The main character is Richard "Spuggy" Hilton (Spuggy being a nickname – the Geordie word for sparrow), who isn't a runner like the rest of his family, but is a keen pigeon fancier and owns 'Blue Flash' – one of the best birds in Newcastle. He and his friend Janie observe some suspicious activity, and link a spate of local art robberies with obscure messages they find on some of the pigeons, but find they have even more problems when they go to spy on the crooks.

Geordie Racer was praised for attempting to bring a grittier edge to educational programmes shown in primary schools.  The series also featured Geordie actor Kevin Whately as Spuggy's father.  Whately, who went on to star in Inspector Morse, was joined on screen by his real-life wife, Madelaine Newton, who played his on-screen wife.  This was not an intentional decision, but merely an accidental coincidence.

Cast
 Leon Armstrong as Spuggy Hilton
 Lien Lu as Janie Chung
 Lesley Casey as Cath Hilton
 Brian Hogg as Victor
 Madelaine Newton as Bev Hilton
 Fred Pearson as Baz Bailey
 Peter Rowell as Mickey Stone
 Kevin Whately as Ray Hilton
 Bungo as Plod
 Charles Collingwood as Wordy
 Katie Hebb as Wordy puppeteer
 Rachel Mackay as Bug-Bopper
 Mary Edwards as Bug-Bopper puppeteer

Episodes

1. Runners and Fliers

2. Down in the Cellars

3. Pigeon Post

4. This Is Radio Newcastle

5. Race Day

6. Light of St Mary

7. Lost Bird

8. Have You Gone Daft, Man?

9. If Only We Knew When...

10. Run!

Theme tune

The theme tune was sung by Derek Griffiths.  The lyrics are:

References

External links
 

1988 British television series debuts
1988 British television series endings
1980s British children's television series
BBC children's television shows
British children's education television series
British television shows for schools
Look and Read
Reading and literacy television series
Television shows set in Tyne and Wear
Television shows set in Newcastle upon Tyne